Cigno has been borne by at least three ships of the Italian Navy and may refer to:

 , a  launched in 1906 and discarded in 1923.
 , a  launched in 1936 and sunk in 1943.
 , a  launched in 1955 and decommissioned in 1983. 

Italian Navy ship names